The women's individual épée competition at the 2002 Asian Games in Busan was held on 1 October at the Gangseo Gymnasium.

Schedule
All times are Korea Standard Time (UTC+09:00)

Results 
Legend
DNS — Did not start

Preliminary pool

Knockout round

Final standing

References
2002 Asian Games Report, Page 410

External links
 Official website

Women Epee